F1 2018 is the official video game of the 2018 Formula One World Championship developed and published by Codemasters. The game includes all twenty-one circuits from the calendar, and all twenty drivers and ten teams competing in the season. It was released on 24 August for Microsoft Windows, PlayStation 4 and Xbox One.

Features
F1 2018 features substantial revisions to its "Career Mode" compared to previous systems. F1 2017 introduced a detailed progression system that allowed the player to focus on developing the engine, chassis and aerodynamics of their car. This was simplified in F1 2018 as Codemasters' research demonstrated that players were losing interest in the game before completing the car's development cycle.

Players develop their cars by spending "development points", which are earned by meeting research and development targets during free practice sessions. Codemasters have introduced a wider range of free practice programs to the game in a bid to extend the game's longevity. At the halfway point of each championship, the player has the option of ending their development cycle and banking all future development points for the next championship. This function has a renewed importance in F1 2018 as teams are subject to rule changes at the end of each championship which can potentially compromise the car's performance.

As with previous titles, F1 2018 includes "Classic Cars", these being Formula One cars from previous seasons. The game includes much older cars dating back to the 1970s, such as the 1972 Lotus 72D, which took Emerson Fittipaldi to his first world championship, the McLaren M23 and the Ferrari 312T, which were driven by James Hunt and Niki Lauda during the  championship; the special edition includes the Brawn BGP 001, the car which Jenson Button and Brawn GP won the  World Drivers' and World Constructors' Championships; and the Williams FW25, the car with which Juan Pablo Montoya finished third in the 2003 championship. All of the Classic Cars that were featured in F1 2017 are included in F1 2018.

As the game is based on the 2018 championship, the Circuit Paul Ricard made its debut in the series. The Hockenheimring, which was last featured in F1 2016, made its return to the game.

Also due to 2018 regulations, the halo makes its debut in the F1 games.

F1's official theme song, composed by Brian Tyler, also makes its debut in the F1 games in certain parts, such as the game's intro cinematic (2nd gameplay trailer), as well as the pre-race and post-race scenes.

The game also features an online multiplayer mode. There are different leagues that require the player to get an obligatory number of trophies to reach. The player can win or lose trophies depending on their performances on these online races. Actions such as cutting corners or colliding with other cars have a negative effect on the player's "Safety Rating". This rates players based on their overall cleanliness in a similar way to the Super License system for real Formula 1 drivers.

Development
Following widespread criticism of a qualifying format used in the opening rounds of the 2016 championship, the Fédération Internationale de l'Automobile (FIA) and commercial rights holder Liberty Media announced plans to trial regulation changes through the Formula One eSports Series, which debuted in 2017 with the release of the F1 2017 video game.

Reception

F1 2018 was the bestselling game in the United Kingdom during its first week on sale. In Japan, the PlayStation 4 version sold 5,517 copies during its first week of release. It was also the bestselling physical retail game across Europe, the Middle East and Africa throughout the week beginning August 26, 2018, and the second-best selling digital game throughout the same week.

Accolades

References

2018 video games
Android (operating system) games
Codemasters games
Ego (game engine) games
Esports games
F1 (video game series)
IOS games
Linux games
PlayStation 4 games
PlayStation 4 Pro enhanced games
Racing video games
Video games set in Australia
Video games set in Austria
Video games set in Azerbaijan
Video games set in Bahrain
Video games set in Belgium
Video games set in Brazil
Video games set in Canada
Video games set in China
Video games set in France
Video games set in Germany
Video games set in Hungary
Video games set in Italy
Video games set in Japan
Video games set in Malaysia
Video games set in Mexico
Video games set in Monaco
Video games set in Russia
Video games set in Singapore
Video games set in Spain
Video games set in Texas
Video games set in the United Arab Emirates
Video games set in the United Kingdom
Windows games
Xbox One games
Xbox One X enhanced games
Multiplayer and single-player video games
Deep Silver games
Video games developed in the United Kingdom